Meshir 30 - Coptic Calendar - Paremhat 2

The first day of the Coptic month of Paremhat, the seventh month of the Coptic year. In common years, this day corresponds to February 25, of the Julian Calendar, and March 10, of the Gregorian Calendar. This day falls in the Coptic Season of Shemu, the season of the Harvest.

Commemorations

Martyrs 

 The martyrdom of Saints Makronius and Thecla 
 The martyrdom of Saint Alexandros the Soldier

Saints 

 The departure of Saint Narcissus, Bishop of Jerusalem
 The departure of Saint Marcura the Bishop 
 The departure of Saint George the Monk, known as Ebn el-A'ameed and Ebn el-Makeen

References 

Days of the Coptic calendar